Xanthinol is a drug prepared from theophylline used as a vasodilator.  It is most often used as the salt with niacin (nicotinic acid), known as xanthinol nicotinate.

References

Vasodilators
Xanthines
Diols